The Prevention of Terrorism Act 2015 (abbreviated POTA), is an anti-terrorism law that was passed by the Malaysian government on 7 April 2015. It enables the Malaysian authorities to detain terror suspects without trial for a period of two years. POTA also does not allow any judicial reviews of detentions. Instead, detentions will be reviewed by a special Prevention of Terrorism Board. The POTA bill has been criticised by opposition elements as a reincarnation of the former Internal Security Act, which was revoked in 2012. The passage of POTA coincided with the arrest of seventeen suspected militants who were involved in an alleged terror plot in the capital Kuala Lumpur.

Structure
The Prevention of Terrorism Act 2015, in its current form (as of 4 June 2015), consists of 5 Parts containing 35 sections and 1 schedule (including no amendment).
 Part I: Preliminary
 Part II: Powers of Arrest and Remand
 Part III: Inquiries
 Part IV: Detention and Restriction Orders
 Part V: General
 Schedule

Notes and references

External links
 Prevention of Terrorism Act 2015 

Malaysian federal legislation
Terrorism in Malaysia
2015 in Malaysian law